Ryan Scicluna (born 30 July 1993) is a Maltese international footballer who plays for Balzan on loan from Birkirkara, as a midfielder.

Career
Scicluna has played club football for Birkirkara.

He made his international debut for Malta in 2014.

On 11 August 2019, Scicluna was loaned out from Birkirkara to Balzan until June 2020.

References

1993 births
Living people
Maltese footballers
Malta international footballers
Birkirkara F.C. players
Balzan F.C. players
Maltese Premier League players
Association football fullbacks